The Jamie, Frosty, and Frank Show was a radio show which ran from 1994 to 1999 on Denver's Alice 105.9 and from 1998 to 1999 on Los Angeles's Star 98.7. The show was first hosted by Jamie White, Frosty Stilwell and Frank Kramer.

The show was originally called "Frosty and Frank" with Jamie White reading traffic and weather. Then the show was renamed to "Frosty, Frank, and Jamie", but audience members mistook "Frosty Frank" as a single person so they renamed the show to "Frosty, Jamie, and Frank". Shortly before the show was moved from Denver to Los Angeles, under contract negotiations, Jamie White had her name moved to first placement.

Each show ended with Jamie, Frosty, and Frank apologizing to anybody and anything they'd potentially offended during that particular broadcast while Brenda Lee's "I'm Sorry" played in the background.

For much of its run on Alice 105.9, the Jamie, Frosty, and Frank Show was the highest-rated radio program in the Denver area.  In 1998, however, the trio was moved to Los Angeles, where they quickly rose to the second-highest-rated English language program in a larger and more competitive market. Star 98.7's own ratings had been dropping for some time. The show continued to be simultaneously broadcast on Alice 105.9 during that period.

On September 15, 1999, Frosty and Frank were suddenly and inexplicably removed from the show and replaced with Danny Bonaduce, former child-star.  Fans of Jamie, Frosty, and Frank protested, and Jamie herself referred to the change as "a forced decision".  Frosty and Frank were quieter but obviously displeased, stating, "Yes, there is a lot to the story, but we can't say much" and "I could be better, but that's a long story, and if I told you, I wouldn't get paid", respectively. Bonaduce was fired in 2005.

In 2000, Frosty and Frank joined Heidi Hamilton, a former traffic news anchor they had met at Star 98.7, to form the Frosty, Heidi & Frank show, which aired on 97.1 FreeFM and later on 790 KABC (AM) Talk Radio in Los Angeles. On January 4, 2007, Frosty and Frank invited Danny Bonaduce onto the show and the three of them traded behind-the-scenes stories about the drama that had unfolded at Star 98.7.  All three of her former co-hosts alleged that Jamie was an extremely difficult and demanding person to work with, that she schemed behind the scenes to have her co-workers fired, and that she didn't want to share a toll-free number with the other hosts to take callers.  Bonaduce called her a "Texas Chainsaw Massacre of a personality... the worst experience of my life" and Frosty and Frank said she was a "witch" and "excruciating."

On July 5, 2005, Jamie White was paired up with Jack Heine and Mike "Stench" Roberts to form the Jamie, Jack, and Stench show on Star 98.7, until January 3, 2007, when all three were released from Star 98.7 with the station focusing more on music and artist driven content.

On June 1, 2012, Star 101.3 in San Francisco announced that Frosty Stilwell would join Sandy Stec in hosting the station's morning show.

Since 2012 the program known as "The Heidi & Frank Show" has been broadcasting on 95.5 KLOS in Los Angeles.

On September 6th, 2016, Frosty rejoined the Heidi and Frank show on KLOS 95.5 to reunite the Frosty, Heidi and Frank show. He was released from the show in 2020 due to the COVID-19 pandemic.

References

External links
 The Westword, February 3, 2000
 Radio AM to FM, July 8, 2005
 Radio-info.com

American talk radio programs